Brzózka may refer to the following places in Poland:
Brzózka, Lower Silesian Voivodeship (south-west Poland)
Brzózka, Masovian Voivodeship (east-central Poland)
Brzózka, Lubusz Voivodeship (west Poland)

Persons 
 Stefan Brzózka (born 1931) - Polish chess master.